Hohepa Te Toiroa Tahuriorangi (born 31 March 1995) is a New Zealand rugby union player who currently plays as a half-back for in the Mitre 10 Cup and the Crusaders in Super Rugby. In 2018 Tahuriorangi was selected to play for the All Blacks.

Playing career

Domestic career 
Tahuriorangi was born and raised in Rotorua, where he has tribal links to Ngāti Pikiao and Ngāti Whakaue. He attended Rotorua Primary School and then Rotorua Boys High School. Following the end of High School, Tahuriorangi moved to Taranaki where he played for the New Plymouth Old Boys Premier Team in 2014–15. An impressive performance saw Tahuriorangi's selection for two national teams in 2015, firstly New Zealand U20 and then NZ Barbarians.

Completing a two year stint with the Hurricanes Tahuriorangi was signed up by the Chiefs for the 2018 season. Brad Weber, the Chiefs resident halfback, spent much of the early 2018 season nursing an injury leaving Tahuriorangi to make the most out of extra time on the field.

In August 2021, Tahuriorangi signed for the Crusaders for the 2022 Super Rugby Pacific season. He cited Scott Robertson as a figure who attracted him to the franchise. In March of 2022, he was named to start for his first Crusaders appearance against Moana Pasifika.

International career 
In 2017 Tahuriorangi was called into the Maori All Blacks for their match with the British & Irish Lions in Rotorua. Tahuriorangi did not take the field however in the wet encounter.

Tahuriorangi’s performance caught the attention of All Black selectors who were searching for a third halfback following Tawera Kerr-Barlow’s departure to France.

Tahuriorangi was announced as the third halfback for the All Blacks in May 2018. In only his second test, Tahuriorangi received the starting number 9 jersey and scored his first test try in a dominant victory over Japan.

References

1995 births
Living people
Rugby union scrum-halves
Taranaki rugby union players
People educated at Rotorua Boys' High School
Ngāti Whakaue people
Ngāti Pikiao people
Māori All Blacks players
New Zealand rugby union players
Rugby union players from Rotorua
Hurricanes (rugby union) players
Chiefs (rugby union) players
New Zealand international rugby union players
Bay of Plenty rugby union players
Crusaders (rugby union) players
Waikato rugby union players
Highlanders (rugby union) players